Verkhnyaya Gorka is a rural locality (a village) in Gorodishchenskoye Rural Settlement, Nyuksensky District, Vologda Oblast, Russia. The population was 37 as of 2002.

Geography 
Verkhnyaya Gorka is located 40 km southeast of Nyuksenitsa (the district's administrative centre) by road. Sofronovskaya is the nearest rural locality.

References 

Rural localities in Nyuksensky District